Carbuncle (Spanish: Carbunclo, Carbunco or Carbúnculo) is a legendary species of small animal in South American folklore, specifically in the mining folklore of northern Chile. The animal is said to contain riches of some sort; in some versions it is a precious stone that gives fortune and good luck to its owner.

The description of the animal vary. The chaplain and explorer Martín del Barco Centenera describes it in La Argentina (1602) as "a smallish animal, with a shining mirror on its head, like a glowing coal". As explained in the Book of Imaginary Beings Barco Centenera "underwent many hardships hunting the reaches of Paraguayan rivers and jungles for the elusive creature; he never found it." In the same book, the mirror in the carbuncle's head is said to be akin to two lights observed by Spanish explorers in the Strait of Magellan. Gonzalo Fernández de Oviedo y Valdés identified these lights with the gemstones hidden in the brains of dragons. The association is likely derived from the 7th-century Etymologiae of Isidore of Seville.

In Chile some say it moves like a firefly in the night. In Tarapacá, it is said to look like a bivalve with a strong white-blue shine from within the shell which can be observed from a great distance. This "bivalve" is said to have the form of a maize ear, with more than four feet. The "bivalve" Carbunclo is said to have a very good sense of hearing, which it uses to hide from people by closing its shell to be mistaken for a stone. The shining in the interior of the carbuncle is thought by some miners to come from the gold it has inside.

During the great drought of 1924–25 there were reported sightings of carbunclos on moonless nights. Around 1925 a family of carbunclos was seen descending from the mountain of Tulahuén towards Río Grande (Coquimbo Region). Also in northern Chile, a man named Gaspar Huerta is said to have encountered a carbunclo while digging an acequia, but reportedly he could not see what its shape was because he killed it on the spot to recover its riches.

Chilote mythology
In the Chilote mythology of southern Chile the carbunclo is said to be the "guardian of the metals". Descriptions of it vary, from a luminescent small dog, a luminescent bivalve, a cat with a luminescent chin, or a greenish-red fiery light reminiscent of fireflies. The carbunclo is said to manifest itself at night around the Southern Hemisphere winter solstice (late June). According to the myth, someone who sees the carbunclo may find treasures via the following careful steps: First, a lasso or similar objects is to be thrown towards the carbunclo as to trap it. The carbunclo will respond by vanishing along with the object. Then the treasure hunter who threw the object has to return to the site in the morning before dawn and search for the object, which will be completely buried except for a small part that sticks above the ground, often at the feet of a thorny calafate. It is there that the treasure hunter must dig for the treasure. The treasure has to be unearthed, however, in the coming night with a new shovel and in the company of an old widow holding a black cat. With each additional vara (distance of approximately one meter) dug in depth, the black cat has to be thrown into the hole. It will subsequently disappear, but will reappear in the hands of the widow just before the next vara is dug up. The cat is then thrown again and the whole procedure is repeated until the treasure is encountered. If the treasure hunter shows any sign of fear the treasure will turn into rock, and if the cat not is not thrown with each vara, the treasure hunter will die as a result of the noxious gases that the treasure releases.

Etymology and mineralogy

The English word carbuncle and the Spanish word carbunclo comes from the Latin carbunculus, meaning "little coal". Carbunclo is used to refer to ruby because this gemstone's shine is said to resemble the glow of hot coal. However, it is garnet and not ruby that is said to have been the mineralogical identity of the so-called "carbuncle of the ancients".

According to the Book of Imaginary Beings 16th-century Spanish conquistadors began to apply the name to a mysterious small animal they saw in South America.

Notes

References

Spanish-language South American legendary creatures
Mining in Chile
Mining folklore
Legendary invertebrates
Mythological felines
Mythological dogs
Chilote legendary creatures
Gemstones in popular culture
Dragons
Chilean legends
Legendary treasures
Cat folklore